The 2015–16 Mount St. Mary's Mountaineers men's basketball team represented Mount St. Mary's University during the 2015–16 NCAA Division I men's basketball season. The Mountaineers, led by fourth-year head coach Jamion Christian, played their home games at Knott Arena and were members of the Northeast Conference.

Newcomers to the team included incoming freshmen Bryce Thurston and Elijah Long, the latter of whom committed to the Mountaineers after originally planning to play for Florida Gulf Coast. Guard Marcell Haskett signed with the Mountaineers, but later re-opened his recruiting and enrolled in a prep school instead.

Returning players included Byron "BK" Ashe and Gregory Graves, who were both members of the NEC's All-Conference Third Team the previous season. Lamont "Junior" Robinson, now a sophomore, was named to the All-Conference Rookie Team in his freshman year.

They finished the season 14–19, 10–8 in NEC play to finish in fifth place. They defeated St. Francis Brooklyn in the first round of the NEC tournament to advance to the semifinals where they lost to Fairleigh Dickinson.

Previous season

The 2014–15 Mountaineers finished the regular season with a record of 15–14 (11–7 in the Northeast Conference) and qualified for the conference tournament as the #4 seed. They were knocked off by #5 seed Saint Francis (PA) at home in the first game of the tournament, finishing the season at 15–15.

Departures

Roster

Pre-season
 
Greg Alexander, a shooting guard who played two seasons at East Carolina, transferred to Mount St. Mary's in June 2015. Due to NCAA transfer rules, Alexander will sit out the 2015–16 season and will join the Mountaineers in 2016–17 with two seasons of eligibility remaining.

In June 2015, the website Big Apple Buckets, which covers college basketball in the Northeast, named guard Byron "BK" Ashe and forward Gregory Graves as prospective members of its NEC All-Conference First Team. Ashe was described as a "stud ... as evident from his fantastic 119.1 offensive rating in league play (in the 2014–15 season)," while Graves "edge(d) out a group of impressive power forwards thanks to his athleticism, tenacity and efficiency around the rim."

In October, Northeast Conference head coaches voted the Mountaineers as the league's favorite prior to the season. This marked the fifth time in the team's history it was voted preseason favorites, with the most recent being 2009–10.

Ashe and Graves were voted to the official 2015–16 Preseason All-NEC Men's Basketball Team.

Schedule

Prior to the regular season, the Mountaineers won two exhibition games at Knott Arena: 64–44 over Hood College and 79–63 over Randolph–Macon College.

The Mountaineers opened the regular season with an 80–56 loss against the #3-ranked team in the nation, Maryland. Mount St. Mary's also lost its second game, 76–54 to Ohio State.

The Mountaineers fell to 0–3 with a 100–67 loss to Washington, then to 0–4 with a 101–56 loss to #10 Gonzaga. Both games were part of the Battle 4 Atlantis mainland bracket. Also as part of the tournament, the Mountaineers fell to 0–5 with a 79–74 Thanksgiving Day loss to Elon. The Mountaineers finished last place in the tournament, and fell to 0–6 on the season, with a 69–60 loss to Furman.

In its first non-conference home games, the Mountaineers defeated Patriot League opponents American, 81–56, Loyola (MD), 85–68, and Bucknell, 81–73. The Mountaineers also visited Patriot League opponent Lehigh, losing 76–73.

In an intrastate road game, the Mountaineers lost to UMBC, 75–63. They also dropped road games to James Madison (73–53) and Binghamton (62–53).

Mount St. Mary's finished out-of-conference play with a 3–10 record, winning all three of their home games while going 0–10 on the road.

The Mountaineers opened conference play on January 2 with a 79–63 win at Knott Arena over LIU Brooklyn, the team's first win in a conference home opener since the 2007–08 season. They improved to 2–0 in-conference two days later with a 44–40 overtime win over St. Francis Brooklyn. The Mountaineers got to 3–0 on the NEC season with a home win over Central Connecticut, 73–62, before blowing a 20–point lead and dropping a home game to Bryant, 82–79 in double overtime.

In its first conference road game, Mount St. Mary's jumped out to a 30–point halftime lead and beat Robert Morris 76–52. The Mountaineers moved to 5–1 in conference play with another road victory, 82–72 over Saint Francis (PA). A loss to Sacred Heart, 76–71, dropped the Mountaineers to 5–2 on the conference season.

The Mountaineers' game against Fairleigh Dickinson, originally scheduled for January 23, was postponed by one day due to the January 2016 United States winter storm. When the game was played, Mount St. Mary's won 87–72 to improve to 6–2 in-conference and take over first place.

Mount St. Mary's improved to 7–2 in-conference and completed a season sweep of Robert Morris on January 28 with a 70–49 victory. In their next game, however, the Mountaineers fell behind by 22 points by halftime against Wagner and ultimately lost 73–63. The Mount lost a second consecutive game on February 4, falling 77–74 to LIU Brooklyn. The team's losing streak extended to three two days later, when Wagner blew out the Mountaineers, 72–51, to complete a season sweep.

On February 11, the Mountaineers snapped their losing streak with a 66–61 win over Sacred Heart. The Mountaineers won again by a 66–61 score two days later, completing a season sweep of Saint Francis (PA). The Mount was then upset on the road by Central Connecticut, 76–72.

The Mountaineers were able to hand Bryant its 11th-straight loss, with a 71–53 victory February 20. On February 25, in their final regular-season home game, the Mount fell 67–54 to Fairleigh Dickinson.

Mount St. Mary's finished the regular-season with a 55–49 loss to St. Francis Brooklyn, finishing fifth in the conference with a 10–8 record.

Post-season
The Mountaineers earned the #5 seed in the 2016 Northeast Conference men's basketball tournament and visited #4 seed St. Francis Brooklyn in the quarterfinal round on March 2. In that game, the Mountaineers came back from a 14–point second-half deficit and defeated the Terriers, 60–51.

The Mount St. Mary's season came to an end with an 80–75 loss to Fairleigh Dickinson in the conference semifinals on March 5.

|-
!colspan=11 style="background:#005596; color:#A29161;"| Exhibition

|-
!colspan=11 style="background:#005596; color:#A29161;"| Regular season

|-
!colspan=9 style="background:#005596; color:#A29161;"| NEC regular season

|-
!colspan=9 style="background:#005596; color:#A29161;"| NEC tournament

|-

References

Mount St. Mary's Mountaineers men's basketball seasons
Mount St. Mary's basketball
Mount St. Mary's basketball
Mount St. Mary's